Sawai Madhopur Junction Railway Station (Code: SWM) is a major railway station on New Delhi–Mumbai main line and Jaipur–Mumbai rail line of the West Central Railway zone network. It is very well connected to Gangapur city, Bayana junction, Bharatpur, Mathura, Kanpur Central, Delhi, Hazarat Nizamuddin, Bikaner, Chittaurgarh.

Administration
This station falling under Kota railway division of West Central Railway zone has been classified under 'A' category.

Lines
The main lines passing through Sawai Madhopur are :
 Mumbai–New Delhi line via Kota (Electrified double broad-gauge line)
 –Sawai Madhopur line (single Electrified broad-gauge line)

The station serves as an important halt for all trains that are bound for Jaipur, Mumbai & Delhi. Trains that are bound for  reverse direction here.

Further extension 
A Final Location Survey for 6.98 km long Sawai Madhopur–bypass line was sanctioned in February 2020 after construction of which trains from  can run up to Kota and beyond without loco reversal at Sawai Madhopur. A delay of more than 30 minutes for an engine change at Sawai Madhopur will thus be avoided. The estimated cost of the linking project is Rs 252 crore.

The government has approved the construction of a new broad-gauge line between Ajmer (Nasirabad) and Sawai Madhopur (Chauth Ka Barwara) via Tonk in Rajasthan. The total length of the new line will be 165 km. The line is planned to be completed in eight years during the 13th Plan period. It will be an alternate route between Chittaurgarh and Sawai Madhopur on the Delhi–Ahmedabad route.

Luxury tourist trains
Several Luxury trains make a scheduled stop at Sawai Madhopur Junction on their eight-day round trip of tourist destinations.

 Palace on Wheels
 Royal Rajasthan on Wheels
 Maharaja Express
 Deccan Odyssey

The station got the award for the Best Tourist Friendly Railway Station by Lok Sabha Speaker Sumitra Mahajan at a glittering ceremony at Vigyan Bhawan in New Delhi on the occasion of the Union Tourism Ministry's ‘National Tourism Awards for the year 2014-2015’. Earlier, Sawai Madhopur railway station has also been awarded as the ‘First Heritage Railway Station’.

Initiative
The Indian Railways considered the proposal of the World Wildlife Fund to promote sanctuaries as tourist destinations, to showcase jungle life and to spread awareness about conservation and promote tourism,  and began the campaign with railway stations at Sawai Madhopur and Bharatpur Junction for pictorial representation of natural habitats, wildlife, trees, bushes, waterbodies. These paintings have made the railway station a living art museum.

Gallery

See also

 Ranthambore National Park
 Ranthambore Fort
 Ranthambore railway station
 Rajiv Gandhi Regional Museum of Natural History
 Shilpgram, Sawai Madhopur

References

External links
 
 

Railway stations in Sawai Madhopur district
Kota railway division
Sawai Madhopur